Martinj Vrh may refer to:
 Martinj Vrh, Železniki, a settlement in the Municipality of Železniki, Slovenia
 Martinj Vrh, Žiri, a former village in the Municipality of Žiri, Slovenia